Jean Henri De Coene (1798–1866) was a Belgian painter of genre and historical subjects.

De Coene was born at Nederbrakel. He was a pupil of David and of Paelinck, and became professor in the Brussels Academy. He died in that city in 1866. His picture of the 'Incredulity of St. Thomas' gained him the prize in 1827.

References
 

1798 births
1866 deaths
People from Brakel
Belgian painters
Pupils of Jacques-Louis David